The 30th Infantry Division of the Wehrmacht was created on 1 October 1936 in Lübeck and mobilized on 26 August 1939 for the upcoming invasion of Poland. At that time, it consisted of the usual German infantry division elements: three infantry regiments of three battalions each, one three-battalion regiment of light artillery, one battalion of heavy artillery, a panzerjager (anti-tank) battalion, an aufklärungs (reconnaissance) battalion, a signals battalion, a pioneer (engineer) battalion, and divisional supply, medical, and administrative units.

Just prior to the invasion of Poland, the division was positioned on the left wing of Army Group South under the X Army Corps. It was to attack in the general direction of the area in front of Łódź. It fought battles in areas of Kalisch, during the Vistula crossing at Warta, also at Kol. Balin, Niewiesz and Uniejew. During the Battle of Bzura they suffered heavy losses, including 1500 POWs captured by the Poles. They had to reject violent counterattacks and attempts to escape by the trapped Polish troops. Their commander Major General von Briesen personally led his last held in reserve battalion into battle and was seriously wounded and lost his right forearm.  The Division, henceforth was referred to as "Briesen Division". After the Battle of Bzura was over, the division moved north of Lowicz in pursuit of the defeated enemy.

On 16 June 1940, the unit conducted a victory parade in Paris.

In the winter of 1941 the division was trapped in the Demyansk Pocket along with the 12th, 32nd, 123rd and 290th infantry divisions, and the SS-Division Totenkopf, as well as  RAD, police, Todt organization and other auxiliary units, for a total of about 90,000 German troops and around 10,000 auxiliaries. Their commander was General der Infanterie Walter Graf von Brockdorff-Ahlefeldt, commander of the II. Armeekorps (2nd Army Corps).

Commanders
Generalleutnant Carl-Heinrich von Stülpnagel, creation – 4 February 1938
Generalmajor Kurt von Briesen, 4 February 1938 – 1 July 1939
Generalleutnant Franz Böhme, 1 July 1939 – 19 July 1939
General der Infanterie Kurt von Briesen, 19 July 1939 – 25 November 1940
Generalmajor Walter Buechs, November 1940 – 5 January 1941
General der Infanterie Kurt von Tippelskirch, 5 January 1941 – 5 June 1942
Generalleutnant Thomas-Emil von Wickede, 5. Juni 1942 – 29 October 1943
Generalleutnant Paul Winter, September 1943
Generalmajor Gerhard Henke (acting), 29 October 1943 – 5 November 1943
General der Infanterie Wilhelm Haase, 5 November 1943 – 15 March 1944
Generalleutnant Hans von Basse (acting), 15 March 1944 – 15 August 1944
Generalmajor Otto Barth, 15 August 1944 – 30 January 1945
Generalleutnant Albert Henze, 30 January 1945 – capitulation

References

 Breithaupt, Hans (1955). Die Geschichte der 30. Infanterie-Division 1939 – 1945. Podzun, Bad Nauheim.
 
 

0*030
Military units and formations established in 1936
Military units and formations disestablished in 1945